Highway 25, is a north–south highway in Jordan.  It starts in at the Syrian border north of Irbid, on the road to Daraa and passes through Zarqa before going into Greater Amman Municipality, passing east of the city proper.

See also
Itinerary on Google maps

Roads in Jordan